Mark Gorodnitsky (born March 23, 2001) is an Israeli figure skater. He is the 2018 Volvo Open Cup silver medalist and a two-time Israeli national champion (2019, 2021). He has competed in the final segment at three World Junior Championships (2017–2019). His best result, 14th, came at the 2018 edition.

Personal life 
Gorodnitsky was born on March 23, 2001, in Richmond Hill, Ontario, Canada. His sister, Maya, has also competed in figure skating.

Career 
Gorodnitsky began learning to skate in 2005. He debuted on the ISU Junior Grand Prix series in October 2015, in Croatia. In February, he competed at the 2016 Winter Youth Olympics in Norway and finished 13th. He did not advance to the free skate at the 2016 World Junior Championships, held a month later in Debrecen, Hungary.

He was eliminated after the short at the 2017 European Championships but qualified to the free and finished 22nd overall at the 2017 World Junior Championships in Taipei, Taiwan. He placed 18th in the short, 14th in the free, and 14th overall at the 2018 World Junior Championships in Sofia, Bulgaria.

In November 2018, Gorodnitsky won his first senior international medal, taking silver at the Volvo Open Cup. He ranked 15th in the short, 18th in the free, and 17th overall at the 2019 World Junior Championships in Zagreb, Croatia.

In December 2019, he won the Israel national senior title.

Gorodnitsky was assigned to make his Grand Prix debut at the 2020 Skate Canada International, but the event was cancelled as a result of the coronavirus pandemic.

Programs

Competitive highlights 
CS: Challenger Series; JGP: Junior Grand Prix

For Isreal

For Canada

References

External links 

 
 

2001 births
Israeli male single skaters
Living people
Sportspeople from Richmond Hill, Ontario
Figure skaters at the 2016 Winter Youth Olympics
Jewish Israeli sportspeople